Enantia is a genus of butterflies in the subfamily Dismorphiinae. They are native to the Americas.

Species
 Enantia albania (H.W. Bates, 1864) – costa-spotted mimic-white
 Enantia aloikea Brévignon, 1993
 Enantia citrinella (C. Felder & R. Felder, 1861)
 Enantia clarissa (Weymer, 1895)
 Enantia jethys (Boisduval, 1836) – jethys mimic-white
 Enantia limnorina (C. Felder & R. Felder, 1865)
 Enantia lina (Herbst, 1792) – white mimic-white
 Enantia mazai Llorente, 1984 – De la Maza's mimic-white
 Enantia melite (Linnaeus, 1763)

References

External links

 
 
images representing Enantia at Consortium for the Barcode of Life

Dismorphiinae
Pieridae of South America
Pieridae genera
Taxa named by Jacob Hübner